Rogério Dutra da Silva and Júlio Silva were the defending champions, but only Dutra da Silva competed this year.
He partnered with André Baran, but they lost to Tomasz Bednarek and Mateusz Kowalczyk in the semifinals.
Polish pair won this tournament, after defeating Daniel Gimeno-Traver and Pere Riba 6–1, 6–4 in the final match.

Seeds

Draw

Draw

References
 Doubles Draw

Cyclus Open de Tenis - Doubles
2009 Doubles
Cycl